Guðrún Arnardóttir may refer to:

Guðrún Arnardóttir (hurdler) (born 1971), Icelandic track and field athlete
Guðrún Arnardóttir (footballer) (born 1995), Icelandic footballer